Paracotalpa deserta is a beetle in the family Scarabaeidae.

Images

References 

Scarabaeidae
Beetles described in 1940